The Old Lady Who Walked in the Sea (French: La vieille qui marchait dans la mer) is a 1991 French crime comedy-drama film directed by Laurent Heynemann and based on the novel by San Antonio (Frédéric Dard.) Jeanne Moreau won the 1992 César Award for Best Actress for her performance.

Cast
Jeanne Moreau as Lady M
Michel Serrault as Pompilius
Luc Thuillier as Lambert
Géraldine Danon as Noemie
Jean Bouchaud as Mazurier
Marie-Dominique Aumont as Muriel
Hester Wilcox as Director's daughter
Léa Gabriele as Girl in Blue
Lara Guirao as Librarian
Mattia Sbragia as Stern

Reception
The film was not commercially successful in France, selling only 526,018 tickets.

It received mixed reviews from critics. The New York Times called the film "cheerfully depraved", and said Moreau's performance "is a classic star turn that lends an essentially frivolous movie a surprising soulfulness." Empire said "Moreau sparkles as the domineering, violent but ironically godly Lady M: by turns becoming beautiful, tragically little-girl-lost, and almost frightening. Serrault is in equally fine fettle, as a kind of devious old innocent" but their verbal sparring "soon becomes really a tad tiresome." TV Guide called it "an entertaining character study that leans too heavily on Moreau's physical ruin but compensates with the sharp -- but seldom bitter -- dialogue." Time Out remarked that "Heynemann's mainstream comedy has surprisingly dark undercurrents - it's a caper movie which dares to ebb from time to time."

Awards and nominations
César Awards
Won: Best Actress – Leading Role (Jeanne Moreau)

References

1991 films
1990s French-language films
Films featuring a Best Actress César Award-winning performance
Films about con artists
Films scored by Philippe Sarde
1990s crime comedy-drama films
French crime comedy-drama films
1990s French films